Acer coriaceifolium is an Asian species of maple. It has been found only in China (Anhui, Fujian, Guangdong, Guangxi, Guizhou, Hubei, Hunan, Jiangsu, Jiangxi, Sichuan, Zhejiang).

Acer coriaceifolium is a small tree up to 15 meters tall. Leaves are non-compound, thick and leathery, oblong or lance-shaped, up to 12 cm long and 5 cm across, no lobes or teeth.

References

coriaceifolium
Plants described in 1912
Flora of China